Mike Lafferty may refer to:

 Mike Lafferty (motorcyclist) (born 1975), American Enduro racer
 Mike Lafferty (alpine skier) (born 1948), American former alpine skier